The D13E locomotives is a diesel locomotive and currently used on Vietnam Railways network. There are two liveries of D13E locomotives, red and white; blue and white.

History 
These locomotives were built by Diesel Locomotive Works in Varanasi, India. The D13E - 701 to D13E - 708 were built from 1983 to 1984; The D13E - 709 to D13E - 715 were built from 1984 to 1985 and the D13E - 716 to D13E - 725 were built from 2001 to 2002. In Vietnam, D13E - 716 to D13E - 725 with blue and white livery are popular in the North and D13E - 701 to D13E -715 with red and white livery are popular in the South.

Information 
Manufacturer: Diesel Locomotive Works (India)
Built: 1984–2002
Power type: Diesel
Gauge: 1.000 mm
Maximum speed: 100 km/h
Engine: DLW ALCO 251D-6 6 cylinder, 4 stroke inline
Power: 1350 hp
Transmission: DC - DC
UIC: Co' Co'

References

Banaras Locomotive Works locomotives
Diesel locomotives of Vietnam
Metre gauge diesel locomotives